Jack Chiles Peerson (1910–1966) was an American Major League Baseball shortstop.

References

Major League Baseball shortstops
Philadelphia Athletics players
Baseball players from Georgia (U.S. state)
People from Brunswick, Georgia
1910 births
1966 deaths